George Arthur (30 June 1968 – 14 June 2015) was a Ghanaian football player. A midfielder and forward, Arthur made his professional debut in 1982 and played for the BA Stars, Kumasi Asante Kotoko, and Egypt's Al Ahly. Arthur was a member of Ghana's national team from the late 1980s to 1994. He retired in 1999 and later became the BA Stars CEO. Arthur collapsed at the restaurant Dreamers in Sunyani and was declared dead at the Brong Ahafo Regional Hospital on 14 June 2015.

References

External links

2015 deaths
Ghanaian footballers
Ghana international footballers
Association football midfielders
Association football forwards
Asante Kotoko S.C. players
Al Ahly SC players
1968 births
Ghanaian expatriate footballers
Ghanaian expatriate sportspeople in Egypt
Ghanaian expatriate sportspeople in Germany
Egyptian Premier League players
BA Stars F.C. players